Anathalon (or Anatalius, Anatolius, Byzantine Greek: Ανατόλιος) was the first recorded Bishop of Milan and lived at the end 2nd-century or early 3rd-century. He is honoured as a Saint in the Catholic Church and his feast day is on September 25 in Milan. A late tradition made him the first bishop of Brescia where his feast day is celebrated on September 24.

Life
Almost nothing is known about the life and the episcopate of Anathalon, except that he had a Greek name, that he was bishop of Milan at the end 2nd-century or early 3rd-century, and that he died during a pastoral trip in Brescia, which was under his jurisdiction.

Middle age texts add biographic details which are to be considered legendary. The treatise De Episcopis Mettensibus of Paul the Deacon (8th-century) narrates that Anathalon was a pupil of Saint Peter who sent him as bishop in Milan, while the Historia Dataria (11th-century) explains that Anathalon was a disciple of the Apostle Barnabas who came to preach in Italy and consecrated him as bishop of Milan. Another legend says that Anathalon built a church in Milan dedicated to the Savior over an ancient pagan temple dedicated to Mercury, in an area where now stand the church of San Giorgio al Palazzo.

Veneration
The older place of veneration for this saint was the basilica ad Concilia Sanctorum in Milan, today no more extant, near the present church of San Babila. Only in 1268 his relics were discovered in Brescia and translated into the church of Saint Florian. In 1472 his relics were translated to the Old Cathedral of Brescia where are today.

Notes

External links
Saints.SQPN: Anathalon of Milan
Catholic Online: Anatahalon

Bishops of Milan
3rd-century Christian saints
Saints from Roman Italy